Shagonar (Şagaan-Arıg) is a town and the administrative center of Ulug-Khemsky District in the Tuva Republic, Russia, located on the left bank of the Yenisei River,  west of Kyzyl, the capital of the republic. As of the 2010 Census, its population was 10,956.

History
It had been known since 1888. Town status was granted to it in 1945. The original town of Shagonar was engulfed by water in the 1970s due to the construction of the Sayano-Shushenskaya Dam. It was rebuilt  from the original location.

Administrative and municipal status
Within the framework of administrative divisions, Shagonar serves as the administrative center of Ulug-Khemsky District. As an administrative division, it is incorporated within Ulug-Khemsky District as Shagonar Town Under District Jurisdiction. As a municipal division, Shagonar Town Under District Jurisdiction is incorporated within Ulug-Khemsky Municipal District as Shagonar Urban Settlement.

References

Notes

Sources

Cities and towns in Tuva
Submerged places
1945 establishments in the Soviet Union
Populated places on the Yenisei River